The River's End is a 1919 western novel by the American writer James Oliver Curwood. A Mountie pursues an escaped convict, but later attempts to clear his name.

Adaptations
The novel has been turned into three films, a 1920 silent film The River's End, a 1930 sound film River's End and a 1940 film River's End.

References

Bibliography
 Pitts, Michael R. Western Movies: A Guide to 5,105 Feature Films. McFarland, 2012.

1919 American novels
Novels by James Oliver Curwood
American novels adapted into films
Novels set in Canada